Hemerocallis citrina, common names citron daylily and long yellow daylily,  is a species of herbaceous perennial plant in the family Asphodelaceae.

Description
It has bright green, linear arching leaves about 40 cm long. They bloom from June to July. Long yellow day lily is cultivated in Asia for its edible flowers.

Distribution and habitat
This species is native to East Asia and China.

Culinary uses
The tubers, inflorescences, buds and flowers can all be cooked and eaten. Dried or fresh flowers, sometimes called "gum jum" or "golden needles" or as huánghuācài   are used in Chinese cuisine for dishes including hot and sour soup, daylily soup (金針花湯), Buddha's delight, and moo shu pork. 

In Burmese, dried lily flowers are called pangyauk, and feature in several soups and Burmese salads, including kya zan hinga.

References

External links

 Missouri Botanical Garden
 Tropicos
 The Plant List
 
 Flora of China Editorial Committee. 2000. Flora of China (Flagellariaceae through Marantaceae). 24: 1–431. In C. Y. Wu, P. H. Raven & D. Y. Hong Fl. China. Science Press & Missouri Botanical Garden Press, Beijing & St. Louis.

citrina
Chinese condiments
Chinese soups
Edible plants
Flora of China
Flora of Eastern Asia
Garden plants
Leaf vegetables
Plants described in 1897
Vegetarian dishes of China